Detours is the sixth studio album by the American singer-songwriter Sheryl Crow, released on February 5, 2008. A return to Crow's forte in roots rock, the album also marks her reunion with Bill Bottrell, who produced her 1993 debut album, Tuesday Night Music Club, and briefly worked on her 1996 album, Sheryl Crow.

The album peaked at number two in the United States, becoming Crow's third consecutive album to do so, and sold over 700,000 copies worldwide up to 2010. It was nominated for a Grammy Award for Best Pop Vocal Album on December 4, 2008.

Production
Detours was recorded at Crow's Nashville farm and includes 14 of the 24 songs recorded. The first single from the album, "Shine over Babylon", is a folk-rock anthem. Crow told Billboard in summer 2007 that the song "is very environmentally conscious, in the tradition of Bob Dylan". The single ended up being a radio-airplay release and reached #42 on the Italy Singles Chart and #4 on the Billboard Adult album alternative chart. Crow further stated:

In additional comments on her website, Crow describes the single as "in every way a desperate cry for understanding. Perhaps it is even a battle song in the face of fear."

In another statement, Crow described the record as "the most honest record I've ever made. It's about being forced to wake up".

The second single culled from the album was "Love Is Free", which, in Crow's own words, was "inspired by [the effect of Hurricane Katrina on] New Orleans. What struck me about it is the stoicism of the New Orleans people, they are very spiritually based. You can see it in their eyes that they aren't going to give up, they are going to rebuild."
So far "Love Is Free" has gained much airplay in the United States and has already begun to enter the Billboard charts: the U.S. Hot 100 (#77), the Canadian Hot 100 (#53) and the Japanese Hot 100 (#10).

Perhaps coincidentally, while the New Orleans-inspired single was distributed and its allusions were noted by Crow during appearances on American television, the album itself was released on the day of the 2008 New Orleans Mardi Gras.

"Motivation" was released as a radio-single only and peaked at #14 on the Billboard Triple A chart in the US. The title track, "Detours", charted at  #13 in the US after Crow performed it on the Ellen DeGeneres Show.

Official videos 
 "Shine over Babylon"
 "Lullaby for Wyatt"
 "Love Is Free"
 "God Bless This Mess"
 "Now That You're Gone"
 "Out of Our Heads"
 "Gasoline"

Critical reception

Detours scored a 75 on Metacritic, indicating "generally favorable" reviews.

Track listing
All lyrics and music by Sheryl Crow, except where noted

Personnel 

 Adrián Agustin – assistant engineer
 Ahmed AlHirmi – vocals
 Abdulla AlKhalifa – vocal arrangement, vocal producer
 Rosanna Arquette – vocals
 Catherine Berclaz – art direction, creative director
 Bill Bottrell – organ, synthesizer, acoustic guitar, bass guitar, percussion, pedal steel, drums, electric guitar, marimba, pipe, vocals, choir, chorus, producer, engineer, mellotron, acoustic bass, string arrangements, drum programming, mixing, synthesizer bass, wurlitzer
 Doyle Bramhall II – electric guitar
 Teresa Bustillo – assistant
 Matt Butler – cello
 Sheryl Crow – organ, acoustic guitar, bass guitar, piano, accordion, vocals, choir, chorus, handclapping
 Wyatt Crow – noise
 Greg d'Augelli – brass
 Brendan Dekora – assistant engineer
 Mike Elizondo – synthesizer, acoustic guitar, bass guitar, drums, sampling, drum programming
 Eric Fritsch – engineer
 Ben Harper – vocals
 Chris Hudson – production coordination
 Brian MacLeod – percussion, drums, sampling, drum programming
 Alex Pavlides – assistant engineer
 Julian Peploe – art direction, package design
 Mike Rowe – flute sample
 Norman Jean Roy – photography
 Doug Sax – mastering
 Marva Soogrim – vocals
 Zeph Sowers – assistant engineer
 Jeremy Stacey – piano, drums, timbales, vocals, kalimba
 Shari Sutcliffe – contractor
 Matt Tait – engineer
 Ken Takahashi – assistant engineer
 Jeff Trott – acoustic guitar, bass guitar, electric guitar, vocals, choir, chorus, slide guitar
 Scooter Weintraub – management
 Pam Wertheimer – management
 David Allen Young – assistant engineer

Release history and chart performance
Detours debuted at number two on the U.S. Billboard 200 chart, selling about 92,000 copies in its first week and an additional 52,000 copies in its second week. As of May 26, 2010, the album had sold 405,000 copies in the US.

Year-end charts

Certifications

References

2008 albums
Sheryl Crow albums
Albums produced by Bill Bottrell
A&M Records albums